Domenico Vincenzo Maria Puccini (5 April 1772 – 25 May 1815) was an Italian composer, a contemporary of Muzio Clementi,  Johann Nepomuk Hummel, Franz Schubert and Ludwig van Beethoven.

Puccini was born in Lucca into a Tuscan musical family of at least five generations: his father was Antonio Puccini, his grandfather was Giacomo Puccini (senior), his son was Michele Puccini, and his grandson was the opera composer Giacomo Puccini.

His works include a piano concerto in B and several dozen piano sonatas.

Puccini died in Lucca in 1815.

References
 The Puccini companion, ed. by William Weaver and Simonetta Puccini (New York: W.W. Norton, [1994(?)]), .
 I Puccini: Musicisti di Lucca, Vol. 5, dir. by Gianfranco Cosmi (Bongiovanni, GB 2349–2, 2004), Audio CD.

 
1772 births
1815 deaths
Italian male classical composers
Musicians from Lucca
18th-century Italian composers
18th-century male musicians
19th-century Italian composers
19th-century classical composers
19th-century Italian male musicians